Stade Lomipeau is a stadium in Mata-Utu, Wallis Island, Wallis and Futuna.

References

Football venues in Wallis and Futuna
Mata-Utu